Blancmange (from  ) is a sweet dessert popular throughout Europe commonly made with milk or cream and sugar thickened with rice flour, gelatin, corn starch, or Irish moss (a source of carrageenan), and often flavoured with almonds.

It is usually set in a mould and served cold. Although traditionally white (hence the name, in English literally "white eating"), blancmanges are frequently given alternative colours. Some similar desserts are French chef 's Bavarian cream, Italian , the Middle Eastern , Chinese annin tofu, Hawai'ian  and Puerto Rican .

The historical blancmange originated at some time during the Middle Ages and usually consisted of capon or chicken, milk or almond milk, rice, and sugar and was considered to be ideal for the sick.  is a sweet contemporary Turkish pudding made with shredded chicken, similar to the medieval European dish.

History
 
The origins of the blancmange have long been believed to lie in the introduction of rice and almonds in early medieval Europe by Arab traders. Recently, it has been shown that there have been similar Arab dishes from that period. The Danish work may be a translation of a German cookbook, which is believed to have been based on a Latin or Romance vernacular manuscript from the 12th century or even earlier.

The "whitedish" (from the original Old French term ) was an upper-class dish common to most of Europe during the Middle Ages and early modern period. It occurs in countless variations from recipe collections from all over Europe and was one of the few truly international dishes of medieval and early modern Europe. It is mentioned in the prologue to Geoffrey Chaucer's Canterbury Tales and in an early 15th-century cookbook written by the chefs of Richard II. The basic ingredients were milk or almond milk, sugar, and shredded chicken (usually capon) or fish, often combined with rosewater and rice flour, and mixed into a bland stew. Almond milk and fish were used as substitutes for the other animal products on fast days and Lent. It was also often flavoured with spices like saffron or cinnamon and the chicken could be exchanged for various types of fowl, like quail or partridge. Spices were often used in recipes of the later Middle Ages since they were considered highly prestigious.

On festive occasions and among the upper classes, whitedishes were often rendered more festive by various colouring agents: the reddish-golden yellow of saffron; green with various herbs; or sandalwood for russet. The brightly coloured whitedishes were one of the most common of the early entremets: edibles that were intended to entertain and delight through a gaudy appearance as much as through flavour.

In the 17th century (1666), the durian fruit was compared to blanc-mangé by Alexandre de Rhodes: 

In the 17th century, the whitedish evolved into a meatless dessert pudding with cream and eggs, and later, gelatin. In the 19th century, arrowroot and cornflour were added, and the dish evolved into the modern blancmange.

Etymology

The word blancmange derives from Old French . The name "whitedish" is a modern term used by some historians, though the name historically was either a direct translation from or a calque of the Old French term. Many different local or regional terms were used for the dish in the Middle Ages:

 Portuguese: 
 Spanish: 
 Dutch/Flemish: 
 German: 
 Latin: 

Though it is fairly certain that the etymology is indeed "white dish", medieval sources are not always consistent as to the actual colour of the dish.

See also

References

Sources
Food in the Middle Ages: A Book of Essays (1995) edited by Melitta Weiss Adamson 
Ossa, Germán Patiño (2007). Fogón de negros: cocina y cultura en una región latinoamericana.
Scully, Terence (1995), The Art of Cookery in the Middle Ages.

External links
 Blanc-Manger: A Journey Through Time
 More Intelligent Life article

Almond dishes
British desserts
French cuisine
Puddings
Spanish cuisine